Konstantinos Genidounias (born 3 May 1993) is a Greek water polo player. He was part of the Greek team that one the bronze medal at the 2015 World Aquatics Championships. Genidounias is considered one of the top scorers in the world .His top personal distinction is when he became the top scorer of the Champions League 2018–19 season as he scored 42 goals while in the same year he emerged ninth top player in the world.

He was a member of the team that competed for Greece at the 2016 Summer Olympics. They finished in 6th place.

Graduated with a degree of communications from the University of Southern California where he attended from 2011 to 2014 and was a member of the Men's Water Polo Team winning three consecutive NCAA championships with the USC Trojans under head coach Jovan Vavic.

He plays for Greek powerhouse Olympiacos, with whom he won the 2017–18 LEN Champions League.

Honours

National team
  Silver Medal in 2020 Olympic  Games, Tokyo
  Silver Medal in 2018 Mediterranean Games, Tarragona
  Bronze Medal in 2013 Mediterranean Games, Mersin
  Bronze Medal in 2015 World Championship, Kazan
  Bronze Medal in 2022 World Championship, Budapest
  Bronze Medal in 2016 World League, Huizhou
  Bronze Medal in 2020 World League, Tbilisi
 4th place in 2016 European Championship, Belgrade
 4th place in 2017 World Championship, Budapest
 6th place in 2016 Olympic Games, Rio

Club

Olympiacos

LEN Champions League: 2017–18 ;runners-up: 2015–16, 2018–19
Greek Championship: 2015–16, 2016–17, 2017–18, 2018–19, 2019–20, 2020–21, 2021–22
Greek Cup: 2015–16, 2017–18, 2018–19, 2019–20, 2020–21, 2021–22, 2022–23 
Greek Super Cup: 2018, 2019, 2020

Trojans

NCCA Championship: 2012, 2013, 2014

Awards
Youth European Championship MVP: 2010 Stuttgart
Peter J. Cutino Award: 2015
LEN Champions League Top Scorer: 2018–19 with Olympiacos
Ninth Best European Player in the World by total-waterpolo.net: 2019 
Greek Championship MVP: 2020–21 with Olympiacos
Greek Cup MVP: 2020–21 with Olympiacos

See also
 Greece men's Olympic water polo team records and statistics
 List of World Aquatics Championships medalists in water polo

References

External links
 

Greek male water polo players
Olympiacos Water Polo Club players
Living people
Place of birth missing (living people)
1993 births
World Aquatics Championships medalists in water polo
Water polo players at the 2016 Summer Olympics
Olympic water polo players of Greece
Mediterranean Games medalists in water polo
Mediterranean Games silver medalists for Greece
Mediterranean Games bronze medalists for Greece
Competitors at the 2013 Mediterranean Games
Competitors at the 2018 Mediterranean Games
USC Trojans men's water polo players
Water polo players at the 2020 Summer Olympics
Medalists at the 2020 Summer Olympics
Olympic silver medalists for Greece
Olympic medalists in water polo
Water polo players from Athens